Squads for the 1968 AFC Asian Cup played in Iran.

Head coach:  Mahmoud Bayati

Head coach:  Milovan Ćirić

Head coach:  Sein Hlaing

Head coach:  Tang Sum(鄧森)

   Happy Valley AA
  Citizen AA
 Hong Kong FC
 Sing Tao SC
   Royal Air Force
  Tung Sing FC
 Royal Air Force
 Yuen Long District
 Biu Chun Rangers FC
 Tung Sing FC
 Hong Kong Rangers FC
 Yueng Long District
 South China AA
 Citizen AA
 Biu Chun Rangers FC
 Sing Tao SC
 Hong Kong FC
 Happy Valley AA

Hong Kong national team and Republic of China national team shared same fodder of players during pre-1971. Most (if not all) the players playing in the Hong Kong football league. 
The ROC team practically the A-team, while Hong Kong practically the B-team, with lesser quality of players.

Head coach:  Pau King Yin (鮑景賢)

References

External links

AFC Asian Cup squads